Rollin Township is a civil township of Lenawee County in the U.S. state of Michigan. The population was 3,176 at the 2000 census.

Geography

Communities
Geneva was the name of a post office here from 1854 until 1908.

Demographics
As of the census of 2000, there were 3,176 people, 1,296 households, and 900 families residing in the township. The racial makeup of the township was 98.46% White, 0.13% African American, 0.13% Native American, 0.38% Asian, 0.13% from other races, and 0.79% from two or more races. Hispanic or Latino of any race were 1.29% of the population.

There were 1,296 households, out of which 29.9% had children under the age of 18 living with them, 57.9% were married couples living together, 7.8% had a female householder with no husband present, and 30.5% were non-families. 26.2% of all households were made up of individuals, and 8.4% had someone living alone who was 65 years of age or older.  The average household size was 2.45 and the average family size was 2.93.

In the township the population was spread out, with 25.0% under the age of 18, 6.3% from 18 to 24, 26.9% from 25 to 44, 28.4% from 45 to 64, and 13.4% who were 65 years of age or older.  The median age was 40 years. For every 100 females, there were 104.0 males.  For every 100 females age 18 and over, there were 99.2 males.

The median income for a household in the township was $39,638, and the median income for a family was $54,667. Males had a median income of $36,629 versus $24,250 for females. The per capita income for the township was $21,103.  About 4.1% of families and 6.5% of the population were below the poverty line, including 4.6% of those under age 18 and 13.3% of those age 65 or over.

References

Notes

Sources

External links
Lenawee County government site
Complete text of History of Lenawee County published in 1909 by the Western Historical Society

Townships in Lenawee County, Michigan
Townships in Michigan
1835 establishments in Michigan Territory
Populated places established in 1835